Michael James Gillespie (May 7, 1940July 29, 2020) was an American college baseball coach.  He served as the head coach at UC Irvine and head coach at USC from 1987 to 2006.  He led USC to the 1998 College World Series championship, having previously won it as a player in 1961.

Career

College
Gillespie started his coaching career at the College of the Canyons, a California junior college.  He started the school's baseball program in spring 1971 after the school's fall 1969 founding.  In sixteen seasons as head coach, he had a 420–167 record.

Gillespie posted a 763–471–2 (.618) record as the coach of USC. In addition to the 1998 championship, he led USC to the CWS in 1995, 2000 and 2001, with the 1995 team advancing to the title game. In 2005, 13 former players coached by Gillespie were playing in Major League Baseball, while six of his former players were All-Stars (including Mark Prior, Barry Zito, Aaron Boone, Bret Boone, and Geoff Jenkins in 2003, and Morgan Ensberg in 2005).  He resigned from USC on June 2, 2006.

Gillespie also played baseball at USC under coach Rod Dedeaux, and was a member of the 1961 College World Series champions. Along with Jerry Kindall, he is one of only two individuals who have both played for and coached a College World Series champion.  He was succeeded as USC's head coach by Chad Kreuter, a former major league catcher who is married to Gillespie's daughter Kelly.

In September 2007, Gillespie was named coach of UC Irvine's baseball team, replacing Dave Serrano, who had just guided the Anteaters to their first CWS appearance but left to take over at Cal State Fullerton.

On January 8, 2010, Gillespie was inducted into the American Baseball Coaches Association (ABCA) Hall of Fame.

Professional
On February 2, 2007, Gillespie was named manager of the New York–Penn League Staten Island Yankees.  He replaced Gaylen Pitts, who led the team to its second consecutive New York–Penn League Championship. In his only season, he led them to a 47–28 record.

Death
Gillespie died on July 29, 2020, in Irvine, California.  He was 80, and had suffered from lung issues and a stroke in the time leading up to his death.

Head coaching record
Below is a table of Gillespie's yearly records as an NCAA head baseball coach.

See also
List of current NCAA Division I baseball coaches

References

1940 births
2020 deaths
UC Irvine Anteaters baseball coaches
USC Trojans baseball coaches
USC Trojans baseball players
Sportspeople from Los Angeles
Junior college baseball coaches in the United States
Baseball coaches from California
Baseball players from Los Angeles